CKTY-FM (99.5 MHz) is a radio station in Truro, Nova Scotia. Owned by Bell Media, it broadcasts a country format branded as Pure Country 99.5.

History 

The station has been on the air since September 10, 1947. It originally broadcast at 1400 AM as CKCL then to 600 in 1956, and received CRTC approval to move to 99.5 FM in 2001 after shutting down the AM 600 frequency.

CKTY was formerly the callsign of a now-defunct AM radio station in Sarnia, Ontario, which moved to the FM dial and is now CHKS-FM. CKCL was also a former callsign of a radio station in Toronto, Ontario in the 1920s.

On July 5, 2013, it and CKTO-FM were acquired by Bell Media as part of their acquisition of Astral Media. On May 28, 2019, the station was renamed Pure Country 99.5 as part of a nationwide rebranding of all Bell Media country stations.

References

External links
 
 
 

Kty
Kty
Kty
Truro, Nova Scotia
Radio stations established in 1947
1947 establishments in Nova Scotia